Polyzosteria yingina is a bush cockroach (a member of the Blattidae family) found only in Tasmania. It was first described in 2020 by Shasta Henry and others.

This species consists of  two very distinct populations: one an alpine population found 1000 metres above sealevel and the other found at sealevel on Tasmania's east coast. Mitochondrial molecular analysis indicates that these two populations are a single species.

References

External links
Species new to science:Polyzosteria yingina (images ...)

Cockroaches
Insects of Australia
Insects described in 2020
Fauna of Tasmania